Midway is an unincorporated community in Alameda County, California,  south-southeast of Altamont. It lies at an elevation of 358 feet (109 m).  A post office operated in Midway from 1870 to 1918.

References

External links

Unincorporated communities in California
Unincorporated communities in Alameda County, California